The Health Research Board (HRB) is a government agency responsible for funding, co-ordination, and oversight of medical research in the Ireland.

History
In 1986, the Government of Ireland amalgamated the Medical Research Council of Ireland and the Medico-Social Research Board to establish the HRB under the Health (Corporate Bodies) Act 1961 and statutory instrument 279 of 1986. The HRB's original headquarters was at 73 Lower Baggot Street, Dublin 2. In July 2014, the board relocated to Grattan House, 67-72 Lower Mount Street, Dublin 2.

Chairs of the HRB
 Dr WA Watts 1987 - 1989
 Professor MX FitzGerald 1990 - 1997
 Professor MB Murphy 1997 - 2002
 Professor Hugh R. Brady 2002 - 2003
 Professor D Fitzgerald 2003 - 2007
 Mr Reg Shaw 2007 - 2012
 Dr Declan Bedford 2012 to present

Chief Executives of the HRB
 Lt Comdr EJ Furness and Mr J O'Gorman 1987 - 1988 (jointly, in caretaker roles)
 Dr JV O'Gorman 1988 - 1998
 Dr R Barrington 1998 - 2007
 Dr Hamish Sinclair 2007 - 2008 (acting)
 Mr Enda Connolly 2008 - 2014
 Mr Graham Love 2014–present

References

Medical and health organisations based in the Republic of Ireland
Research funding agencies